The castra of Gherla was a fort in the Roman province of Dacia. An inscription unearthed at the site proves that the stone fortress was erected in 143 AD. In addition to the vicus at the fort, a nearby contemporary settlement and a Roman cemetery were also unearthed in Gherla (Romania). All these sites were abandoned in the 3rd century.

See also
List of castra

External links
Roman castra from Romania - Google Maps / Earth

Notes

Gherla
Roman legionary fortresses in Romania
Ancient history of Transylvania
Historic monuments in Cluj County